Laddie Boy (July 26, 1920 – January 23, 1929) was an Airedale Terrier owned by U.S. President Warren G. Harding. He was born in Toledo, Ohio. His father was Champion Tintern Tip Top. He was presented to US President Warren G. Harding by Charles Quetschke of Caswell Kennels and  became a celebrity during the Harding administration.

Laddie Boy was a faithful dog. When the president played golf and hit a tree, Laddie Boy would run up to the tree and retrieve the ball. Laddie Boy had his own hand-carved chair to sit in during Cabinet meetings. The White House held birthday parties for the dog, invited other neighborhood dogs to join, and served them dog biscuit cake. Newspapers published mock interviews with the dog. Laddie Boy had a caretaker.

He was the first "First Dog" to be regularly covered in the national press.
Harding and his wife Florence shared a love of animals and the First Lady, also an advocate for the care of abused and neglected animals, soon began employing this handsome dog as a poster child for the national promotion of animal rights issues.

Purportedly, the dog howled constantly for three days prior to President Harding's death in August 1923 at the Palace Hotel in San Francisco, knowing of his master's imminent demise. In memory of President Harding and honoring his former employment as a paperboy, newsboys collected 19,134 pennies to be remelted and sculpted into a statue of Laddie Boy. Harding's widow died before the statue was completed in 1927 and the statue was presented to the Smithsonian Institution. Harding's death and the dog were commemorated in song.

After the president's death in 1923, Florence Harding gave the Airedale to Harry Barker, her favorite Secret Service agent. She knew her poor health wouldn't allow her to look after the dog properly. Harry took Laddie home to his family in Boston, and the dog lived a very normal life and was much loved by the Barker family. Laddie's death in 1929 was proclaimed in newspaper headlines across the country.

Laddie is immortalized in bronze along Harding in Rapid City, South Dakota, as part of its "City of Presidents" art installation of presidential statues. In the summer of 2012, Laddie Boy's unique collar, fashioned from Alaskan gold nuggets, was stolen from the Harding Home and Museum.

See also

United States presidential pets
List of individual dogs

References

External links

Presidential dog collar stolen from Harding's home Photograph

1920 animal births
1929 animal deaths
Warren G. Harding
Toledo, Ohio
United States presidential dogs